The GC-2 (or Autovía del Norte, "Northern Highway") is a superhighway in Gran Canaria (Canary Islands). It connects Las Palmas de Gran Canaria with the village of Agaete.

The eastern portion, for about 20 km, is a superhighway with interchange numbers; the western part is like a freeway (because it has exit numbers) but the rest of the highway only has two lanes.

Description

The superhighway begins by the beach area of the island or the Canary Islands' co-capital with the highway GC1.  The highway runs through the downtown area and links with a roundabout interchange with GC31.

The freeway runs within the beaches and the coastline of the Atlantic Ocean for the half part but at around the twentieth kilometre, it becomes a highway after the unidirectional parclo interchanges and runs within the coastline, it later has several interchanges and several towns as it passes to the northwest and finally, it ends in Agaete.

History

The superhighway was first opened in the late-1970s when tourism arrived, it first opened within Las Palmas de Gran Canaria, it later extended to the western part and with the GC31.  The superhighway later extended to the coastline and the highway later bypasses towns in the 1980s and the 1990s to Agaete with several towns, that section within Agaete added interchange numbers and exit numbers but it not classifies as a superhighway.

21st century

A project to extend the GC-2 from Agaete to La Aldea de San Nicolás was drafted between 2001 and 2011. This project was split into two phases:
 Phase 1: La Aldea de San Nicolás to the village of El Risco
 Phase 2: El Risco to Agaete

Phase 1 opened in mid-2017, providing respite to communities that had been cut off when a landslide in September 2016 forced the permanent closure of the nearby GC-200 coastal road.

On 24 September 2019, work began on phase 2 at a projected cost of €157 million, and with the expectation that it would take 65 months to complete.

Municipalities

Las Palmas
Arucas
Santa María de Guía de Gran Canaria
San Bartolomé de Tirajana
Agaete
Artenara
La Aldea de San Nicolás

See also 

 Autopista GC-1
 Autopista GC-3

References

GC-2
Transport in Gran Canaria